Micol Cristini (born 3 June 1997) was an Italian figure skater. She has won senior international medals, including gold at the 2017 Denkova-Staviski Cup. She stopped skating in 2019, she started performing on a cruise ship and the next year she will marry Mattia, her fiance.

Career

Early career 
Micol began learning to skate in 2006. She trained at the Olympic Dream Ice School in Zanica, Province of Bergamo.

She debuted on the ISU Junior Grand Prix series in September 2011, placing 11th in Romania. In January 2012, she competed at the Winter Youth Olympics in Innsbruck, Austria. Ranked 9th in the short program and 12th in the free skate, she finished 11th overall.

2013–2014 season 
Making her senior international debut, Micol placed fourth at the Golden Spin of Zagreb in December 2013. She placed sixth at the Italian Championships. She trained under Silvia Martina in Zanica.

2014–2015 season 
Cristini decided to be coached by Franca Bianconi and Rosanna Murante in Sesto San Giovanni. In December 2014, she won her first senior international medal, bronze, at the Denkova-Staviski Cup in Bulgaria. Later in the same month, she stepped onto her first senior national podium, taking bronze at the Italian Championships.

In January 2015, Cristini represented Italy at the 2015 European Championships in Stockholm, Sweden. Ranked 34th in the short program, she did not advance to the free skate.

2015–2016 season 
Cristini won the silver medal at the Gardena Spring Trophy in April 2016. She did not compete at the Italian Championships.

2016–2017 season 
Cristini placed fourth at the Italian Championships. She won a bronze medal at the Sofia Trophy in February 2017 and silver the following month at the Cup of Tyrol.

2017–2018 season 
Cristini received the gold medal at the Denkova-Staviski Cup, held in November in Bulgaria, and bronze at the Italian Championships in December. She qualified to the final segment at the 2018 European Championships, held in January in Moscow, Russia. Ranked 19th in the short program and 11th in the free skate, she finished as the second-best of Italy's three ladies' competitors, 15th overall.

Programs

Competitive highlights 
CS: Challenger Series; JGP: Junior Grand Prix

References

External links 
 

1997 births
Italian female single skaters
Living people
Sportspeople from Bergamo
Figure skaters at the 2012 Winter Youth Olympics
20th-century Italian women
21st-century Italian women